Sonicare is the brand name of an electric toothbrush produced by Philips.

Product and technology

The brush head vibrates at hundreds of times per second, with the latest models at 31,000 strokes per minute or 62,000 movements per minute (517 Hz).  Rather than connecting to its charger with conductors, it uses inductive charging—the charger includes the primary winding of the voltage-reducing transformer and the fat handle of the brush includes the secondary winding.  The replaceable head is also driven magnetically. Currently, there are multiple types of Sonicare brushes to appeal to every consumer. Typically, the sonicare costs over $100 but new models are available for the price conscious consumer. Also, there is a Sonicare for kids that has 2 different heads that works with a wide variety of ages.

Clinical research

Individual clinical research has shown Sonicare toothbrushes to be more effective than comparable Oral-B electric toothbrushes in reduction of gingival inflammation and therefore improvement in periodontal health. However a 2004 review of 29 studies concluded that only electric toothbrushes with rotational/oscillation movement removed more plaque than other brushes when correctly used. A second review found no clinical evidence for the dynamic fluid activity of the Sonicare toothbrush being more effective in plaque removal than an Oral-B oscillating/rotating electric toothbrush. A 2007 study comparing the two found the rotation/oscillation brush to be more effective in single-use plaque reduction.

An additional study showed that while both Sonicare and Oral B electric toothbrushes do better than manual toothbrushes in removing plaque, reducing gingival inflammation, and reducing probing depths, the Sonicare showed significantly more improvement than Oral B. The percentage reduction in inflammation from baseline at 6 months was 31.9% for Sonicare and 18.1% for Oral B. In regards to probing depth, Sonicare showed a mean reduction of 0.84 mm from baseline at 6 months, while Oral B showed an average reduction of 0.39 mm.

Individual studies have shown that Sonicare toothbrushes are more effective at removing plaque and reducing gingivitis than manual toothbrushes.

History
In 1987, David Giuliani, an entrepreneur with a background in electrical engineering, met with University of Washington professors Drs. David Engel and Roy Martin. They formed a new company named GEMTech to promote a dental hygiene device using a piezoelectric multimorph transducer. After several years of research and creating prototypes, the Sonicare toothbrush was introduced in November 1992 at a periodontal convention.

In 1995, GEMTech changed its name to Optiva Corporation. In October 2000, Philips Domestic Appliances and Personal Care, a division of Philips, acquired the company. A few months later Optiva Corporation changed its name to Philips Oral Healthcare, Inc. By the end of 2001, Sonicare had become the number-one selling rechargeable power toothbrush in the United States. In 2003, to improve Philips brand recognition in the US, Philips rebranded the Sonicare toothbrush as "Philips Sonicare".

See also 

 Electric toothbrush

References 

Philips products
Personal care brands
Oral hygiene
Dental equipment
Products introduced in 1992